DUBC is an acronym that may refer to:
Darjah Utama Bakti Cemerlang, the Singapore Distinguished Service Order uses the post-nominal letters DUBC
Dublin University Boat Club
Durham University Boat Club
WC (rapper), pronounced Dub-C